Margh Malek Rural District is in Laran District of Shahrekord County, Chaharmahal and Bakhtiari province, Iran. At the census of 2006, its population was 2,342 in 589 households; there were 2,097 inhabitants in 623 households at the following census of 2011; and in the most recent census of 2016, the population of the rural district was 2,298 in 698 households. The largest of its eight villages was Margh Malek, with 1,729 people.

References 

Shahrekord County

Rural Districts of Chaharmahal and Bakhtiari Province

Populated places in Chaharmahal and Bakhtiari Province

Populated places in Shahr-e Kord County